Inky Bloaters is the third solo album by Danielle Dax, an English experimental musician and former member of the Lemon Kittens. It was originally recorded between 1985 & 1987, and released in 1987 on the Awesome Records label. This was the last album by Dax released on the Awesome label before signing with Sire. The album was re-released in 1993 on the Biter of Thorpe label (BOT131-04CD) and distributed through World Serpent Distribution.

Dax wrote all the lyrics for the album and shared music writing and arrangement with David Knight. Dax provided vocals, guitars, keyboards, flute, sitar, kalimba, percussion and drone guitar. David Knight played guitars, tapes, keyboards, percussion and drone guitar. Ian Sturgess played additional bass, harmonica, jaw harp and percussion. Steve Reeves played guitar and composed music for When I Was Young. Martyn Watts played drums. The cover artwork is by Dax.

Track listing

All tracks except "Born to Be Bad" appear on the 1988 US compilation Dark Adapted Eye. Tracks 5-6, 8 and 10-11 appear on the 1995 UK compilation Comatose-Non-Reaction. A different recording of "Fizzing Human-Bomb" was released on The Janice Long Session EP.

Singles
Three singles were released from this album between 1985 and 1987. Each single had both a 2-track 7" and 3-track 12".

Yummer Yummer Man (21 October 1985)

7"
"Yummer Yummer Man" - 3:25
"Bad Miss 'M'" - 2:47

12"
"Fizzing Human Bomb" - 3:45
"Yummer Yummer Man" - 3:25
"Bad Miss 'M'" - 2:47

Where the Flies Are (August 1986)

7"
"Where the Flies Are" (Edit) - 2:57
"When I Was Young" - 4:04

12"
"Where the Flies Are" - 3:20
"Up in Arms" - 3:01
"When I Was Young" - 4:04

Big Hollow Man (1987)

7"
"Big Hollow Man" (Remix) - 4:48
"Muzzles" - 3:22

12"
"Big Hollow Man" (Remix) - 4:48
"Muzzles" - 3:22
"The Passing of the Third Floor Back" - 2:53

Charts

Inky Bloaters

"Yummer Yummer Man"

"Where the Flies Are"

"Big Hollow Man"

Release History

References

External links
Danielle Dax Official Website
Danielle Dax Artist Profile
The Danielle Dax Profile

1987 albums
Danielle Dax albums